The Pleasants County Courthouse was built in 1924 in St. Marys, West Virginia. The Neo-Classical Revival style building replaced the original courthouse, which was badly damaged by lightning in 1923. The new courthouse was designed by architects Holmboe & Pogue of Clarksburg and built by Putnam & Foreman of Marietta, Ohio for $99,963. Ornamentation of the facade was omitted to save costs.

References

External links

Courthouses on the National Register of Historic Places in West Virginia
Neoclassical architecture in West Virginia
Government buildings completed in 1924
Buildings and structures in Pleasants County, West Virginia
County courthouses in West Virginia
National Register of Historic Places in Pleasants County, West Virginia